The Victoria's Secret Fashion Show is an annual fashion show sponsored by Victoria's Secret, a brand of lingerie and sleepwear. Victoria's Secret uses the show to promote and market its goods in high-profile settings. The show features some of the world's leading fashion models, such as current Victoria's Secret Angels Adriana Lima, Alessandra Ambrosio, Doutzen Kroes, Behati Prinsloo, Candice Swanepoel and Karlie Kloss. Lindsay Ellingson, Martha Hunt, Jasmine Tookes, Elsa Hosk, Lais Ribeiro, and Stella Maxwell all received billing.

The show featured musical performances by Taylor Swift, Ed Sheeran, Ariana Grande, and Hozier.
	
For the first time, there were not one but two fantasy bras, the Dream Angels Fantasy Bras. They were worn by Alessandra Ambrosio (her second) and Adriana Lima (her third) and worth US$2,000,000 each.

Fashion show segments

Segment 1: Gilded Angels

Segment 2: Exotic Traveler 
This segment was swapped in order of appearance with the third segment, Dream girls, for the TV version.

Segment 3: Dream Girls 
This segment was swapped in order of appearance with the second segment, Exotic Traveler, for the TV version.

Segment 4: University of PINK

Segment 5: Fairy Tale

Segment 6: Angel Ball

Finale 

 Alessandra Ambrosio and  Adriana Lima led the finale.

Index

References

|}

Victoria's Secret
2014 in fashion